Anthony Prymack (born 24 March 1990) is a Canadian foil fencer, team silver medallist at the 2011 Pan American Games in Guadalajara and at the 2014 Pan American Fencing Championships in San José. He reached the final table of 64 at the World Fencing Championships in 2009, 2010, 2013, and 2014. He finished the 2013–14 season No.55 in world rankings, a career best. He started fencing at the age of 7 under fencing master Leslie Palmai who was the head coach of Calgary's Epic Fencing Club.

References

External links

 Profile at the Canadian Olympic Team website

Canadian male foil fencers
Living people
1990 births
Sportspeople from Calgary
Pan American Games silver medalists for Canada
Pan American Games medalists in fencing
Fencers at the 2011 Pan American Games
Medalists at the 2011 Pan American Games